Ust-Kut Airport  is an airport in Irkutsk Oblast, Russia which is located 9 km north of Ust-Kut. It services short-haul routes and links the town to Irkutsk and Krasnoyarsk.

Airlines and destinations

Passenger

Cargo

Facilities 

The airport is operational by schedule. A small airport terminal is able to service 50 pax per hour, but it's enough for operation needments.

A runway is equipped lighting navigational aids and an instrument landing system. It allows aircraft to perform flights whatever weather conditions.

The airport can handle such aircraft as Let L-410, Antonov An-2, Antonov An-12, Antonov An-24, Antonov An-26, Antonov An-30, Antonov An-32, Antonov An-72, Antonov An-74, ATR-42, ATR-72, CRJ-200, Yakovlev Yak-40, Antonov An-140, Antonov An-148, Yakovlev Yak-42, Ilyushin Il-76.

Accidents and incidents 

 On 5 March 1970 an aircraft Lisunov Li-2 (registration number CCCP-58340) of Aeroflot airlines crashed after take-off due to shifting of cargo.
 On 17 December 1976 an aircraft Yakovlev Yak-40 (CCCP-88208) of Aeroflot airlines struck trees, crashed and burst into flames. Aircrew errors and poor ground staff service led to an air disaster. All passengers and crew died.
 On 17 August 2022 an Angara Airlines Antonov AN-24 crash-landed, after its wingtip struck the runway surface upon landing.

References

External links 

  Weather in Airport Ust-Kut
  Ust-Kut Airport Official Website

Airports built in the Soviet Union
Airports in Irkutsk Oblast
Airports established in 1966